The 18th British Independent Film Awards nominations were announced on 3 November 2015.

Awards

Best British Independent Film
Ex Machina
45 Years
Amy
The Lobster
Macbeth

Best Director
Alex Garland - Ex Machina
Andrew Haigh - 45 Years
Asif Kapadia - Amy
Yorgos Lanthimos - The Lobster
Justin Kurzel - Macbeth

Best Actress
Saoirse Ronan - Brooklyn
Marion Cotillard - Macbeth
Carey Mulligan - Suffragette
Charlotte Rampling - 45 Years
Alicia Vikander - The Danish Girl

Best Actor
Tom Hardy - Legend
Tom Courtenay - 45 Years
Colin Farrell - The Lobster
Michael Fassbender - Macbeth
Tom Hiddleston - High-Rise

Best Supporting Actress
Olivia Colman - The Lobster
Helena Bonham Carter - Suffragette
Anne-Marie Duff - Suffragette
Sienna Miller - High-Rise
Julie Walters - Brooklyn

Best Supporting Actor
Brendan Gleeson - Suffragette
Luke Evans - High-Rise
Domhnall Gleeson - Brooklyn
Sean Harris - Macbeth
Ben Whishaw - The Lobster

Most Promising Newcomer
Abigail Hardingham - Nina Forever
Agyness Deyn - Sunset Song
Mia Goth - The Survivalist
Milo Parker - Mr. Holmes
Bel Powley - A Royal Night Out

The Douglas Hickox Award
The Survivalist - Stephen Fingleton
The Hallow - Corin Hardy
Kajaki: The True Story - Paul Katis
Nina Forever - Chris & Ben Blaine
Slow West - John Maclean

Best Screenplay
Ex Machina - Alex Garland
45 Years - Andrew Haigh
Brooklyn - Nick Hornby
High-Rise - Amy Jump
The Lobster - Yorgos Lanthimos, Efthymis Filippou

Best Achievement in Production
Paul Kattis, Andrew De Lotbiniere - Kajaki: The True Story
Triston Goligher - 45 Years
James Gay-Rees - Amy
Ceci Dempsey, Ed Guiney, Yorgos Lanthimos, Lee Magiday - The Lobster
David A Hughes, David Moores - The Violators

Best Technical Achievement
Andrew Whitehurst, Visual Effects - Ex Machina
Adam Arkapaw, Cinematography - Macbeth
Mark Digby, Production Design - Ex Machina
Chris King, Editing - Amy
Fiona Weir, Casting - Brooklyn

Best Documentary
Dark Horse: The Incredible True Story of Dream Alliance - Judith Dawson, Louise Osmond
Amy - James Gay-Rees, Asif Kapadia
How To Change The World - Bous De Jong, Al Morrow, Jerry Rothwell
Palio - James Gay-Rees, John Hunt, Cosima Spender
A Syrian Love Story - Elhum Shakerifar, Sean McAllister

Best Foreign Independent Film
Room - Ed Guiney, David Gross, Emma Donoghue, Lenny Abrahamson
Carol - Elizabeth Karlsen, Stephen Woolley, Christine Vachon, Phyllis Nagy, Todd Haynes
Force Majeure - Erik Hemmendorff, Marie Kjellson, Philippe Bober, Ruben Östlund
Girlhood - Bénédicte Couvreur, Céline Sciamma
Son of Saul - Gábor Sipos, Gábor Rajna, Cara Royer, László Nemes

Discovery Award 

 Orion: The Man Who Would Be King
 Aaaaaaaah!
 Burn Burn Burn
 The Return
 Winter

References

External links
 Website

British Independent Film Awards
2015 film awards
Independent Film Awards
2015 in London
November 2015 events in the United Kingdom